Jennifer Ann Brown (born May 11, 1972) is an American writer best known for teen fiction including her debut novel Hate List (2009). At least from 2013 she also writes fiction under the name Jennifer Scott.

Personal life
Born in Kansas City, Missouri, Brown lives there with her husband and three children as of 2014. She was once a humor columnist for The Kansas City Star, in which she won the Erma Bombeck Global Humor Award in 2005 and 2006.

Publications
Teen fiction
 Hate List (Little, Brown, September 1, 2009)
 Bitter End (May 10, 2011)
 Perfect Escape (July 10, 2012)
 Thousand Words (May 2013)
 Torn Away (May 2014)
 Say Something: a Hate List novella (Hachette Audio, 2014), read by Ivan Martinovic,  
 Shade Me: Nikki Kill Series Book 1 (2016)
 Dare You: Nikki Kill Series Book 2 (February 2017)
 Break Us: Nikki Kill Series Book 3 (February 13, 2018)

Children's fiction
Brown writes fiction for pre-teens, too. The Library of Congress catalog classifies these two stories by subject (LCSH) as astronomy fiction, family fiction, middle-school fiction, etc.; not as science fiction.
 Life on Mars (Bloomsbury, August 2014),  
 How Lunchbox Jones Saved Me from Robots, Traitors, and Missy the Cruel (Bloomsbury, August 2015), 

Women's fiction as Jennifer Scott
Brown writes women's fiction under the name Jennifer Scott.
 The Sister Season (New American Library Accent, 2013), 
 The Accidental Book Club (Accent, 2014), 
 The Hundred Gifts (Accent, 2015), 
 Second Chance Friends (Accent, 2015),

References

External links
 
  as Jennifer Scott
 
 Jennifer Scott at LC Authorities, with 4 records, and Scott at WorldCat

1972 births
American writers of young adult literature
American humorists
American columnists
American women columnists
American women novelists
Living people
21st-century American novelists
21st-century American women writers
Women humorists
Women writers of young adult literature
American women non-fiction writers
21st-century American non-fiction writers